Ulenje is an administrative ward in the Mbeya Rural district of the Mbeya Region of Tanzania. In 2016 the Tanzania National Bureau of Statistics report there were 7,655 people in the ward, from 6,946 in 2012.

Villages and hamlets 
The ward has 6 villages, and 8 hamlets.

 Ihango
 Ihango
 Ilembo
 Malonji
 Togwa
 Itala
 Ibula
 Igwila
 Itala A
 Itala B
 Itandu A
 Itandu B
 Kagera
 Majengo
 Nyeta A
 Nyeta B
 Mbonile
 Ilala
 Kalaja
 Kamficheni
 Mwakibete
 Nyakonde
 Tegela
 Togwa
 Mkuyuni
 Igala
 Mdwadwa
 Mkuyuni
 Natela
 Wanging'ombe
 Ulenje
 Barazani
 Ikeka A
 Ikeka B
 Imaji
 Isyonje
 Kiwanjani
 Magharibi A
 Magharibi B
 Makabichi
 Mansamu
 Wambishe
 Hafurwe
 Ikulila A
 Ikulila B
 Ikulila C
 Magoye
 Nsonya
 Shipinga
 Wambishe

References 

Wards of Mbeya Region